Tillandsia engleriana is a species of flowering plant in the genus Tillandsia. This species is native to Bolivia.

References

engleriana
Flora of Bolivia